Robert Eugene Turner III (born April 8, 1993) is an American basketball player. He played college basketball for New Mexico Junior College and Texas Tech University before going on to play professionally in Asia and Europe. In 2017, he won the Mongolian Superleague with Arhangai Altan, while also being named MVP, and in 2022 he won the Icelandic Cup with Stjarnan.

College career
Turner played for Texas Tech from 2013 to 2015, starting 61 of his 64 games and averaging 8.8 points, 2.8 rebounds, and 2.2 assists per game.

Professional career
Turner joined Stjarnan of the Icelandic top-tier Úrvalsdeild karla in 2021, and led the team in scoring an assists with 23.3 points and 5.2 assists per game. He helped the team win the Icelandic Cup in January 2022. He resigned with the team for the following season. In December 2022, Stjarnan announced that Turners contract had been bought up by a French Pro B club. On 2 January 2023, he signed with Stade Rochelais Basket.

Personal life
Turner was born to LaTanya and Robert Turner Jr., the middle of five children.

References

External links
Profile at Eurobasket.com
Icelandic statistics at Icelandic Basketball Association

1993 births
Living people
American expatriate basketball people in France
American expatriate basketball people in Iceland
American Expatriate basketball people in Mongolia
American men's basketball players
Point guards
Stjarnan men's basketball players
Texas Tech Red Raiders basketball players
Úrvalsdeild karla (basketball) players